Red Mound is an unincorporated community in the Town of Wheatland, Vernon County, Wisconsin, United States.

History
The post office was established in Red Mound on March 15, 1872. L.J. Miller was he first postmaster.

Notes

External links
Red Mound, Wisconsin and the Battle of Bad Axe

Unincorporated communities in Vernon County, Wisconsin
Unincorporated communities in Wisconsin